Ponta do Chão de Mangrade (also: Ponta de Mangrade, Ponta Oeste) is the westernmost point of the Island of Santo Antão, and also the westernmost point of Cape Verde and all Africa. It is located 5 km northwest of Monte Trigo and 31 km west of Porto Novo, in a very remote area. The 1494 Treaty of Tordesillas divided the newly discovered lands outside Europe between Portugal and Spain along a meridian 370 leagues (2,193 km) west of this point.

Ponta de Mangrade Lighthouse

There is a lighthouse on the headland, consisting of a 3 m high white concrete tower with a red lantern.

See also
List of lighthouses in Cape Verde
Geography of Cape Verde

References

Headlands of Cape Verde
Geography of Santo Antão, Cape Verde
Porto Novo Municipality